Louis Kuhne (14 March 1835 – 4 April 1901) was a German naturopath primarily known for his cold water hydrotherapy methods that were meant to improve detoxification functions of the body by stimulation of the lower abdomen.

Biography
Kuhne was a strict vegetarian and forbade his patients the use of salt and sugar in the diet. His conceptual view of the cause for disease was that the average human body was overburdened with toxins that eventually led to degenerations of the internal organs. He stressed the importance of proper digestion and of avoiding constipation.

Kuhne's friction sitz bath and hip baths both involved the patient sitting in a tub filled with relatively cold water (about 10—14°C for the friction bath in the original instructions, although slightly higher temperatures are preferred today) and rubbing the lower abdomen, hips, or genitals with a rough linen cloth. The resulting nerve stimulation by the cold water was supposed to help eliminate toxins. Immediately after the bath the patient is put to bed to warm him up again.
Louis Kuhne created a unique hydrotherapy panacea, including the friction sitz bath, to attempt to heal a wide spectrum of diseases.

The late 19th century and early 20th century saw the birth of Neo-Naturopathy, particularly in Germany. Father Sebastian Kneipp, Dr Benjamin Lust, Louis Kuhne amongst others, were but a few disappointed with the impotence of modern medicine in the face of serious disease.

These men all turned to nature in a quest to heal a diseased body and maintain a lifetime of good health. Inspired by the work of the father of medicine, Hippocrates (400 BCE) who stated that "Nature is the physician of disease" they started successfully experimenting with various methods using water as a healing agent. Hippocrates is famous for studying the healing powers of water, and subsequently creating thalassotherapy.

Books by Kuhne
The New Science of Healing (1899) — 
The Science of Facial Expression (1917) —

References
Erich Rauch: Naturopathic Treatment of Colds and Infectious Diseases, Thieme (1983), p. 42–46, 
Ernest William Cordingley: Principles and Practice of Naturopathy: A Compendium of Natural Healing (1924), chapter 10 — 
Gandhi, Mahatma, 1869-1948. (1993). An autobiography : the story of my experiments with truth. Boston :Beacon Press, p 226-229,

External links

 

1835 births
1901 deaths
German nutritionists
Hydrotherapists
Naturopaths